The Grinder  is an American single-camera legal comedy television series created by Jarrad Paul and Andrew Mogel. The show was picked up to series by Fox on May 8, 2015, and premiered on September 29, 2015. On October 15, 2015, Fox ordered six additional scripts for the first season, potentially increasing the season order to 19 episodes. On October 27, 2015, Fox ordered a full season of 22 episodes for the first season.

Despite being acclaimed by critics and viewers, the show never achieved high ratings. The Grinder was canceled by Fox on May 16, 2016.

Plot
The series follows television actor Dean Sanderson Jr., who returns to his hometown of Boise, Idaho, after his long-running television series, The Grinder, ends. Though Dean is not a lawyer, he believes that his experience playing one on television makes him qualified to practice law. He decides to join his family's law firm, Sanderson & Yao, much to the chagrin of his younger brother Stewart, who is an actual lawyer. Stewart and a new hire named Claire are the only people who seem to comprehend that Dean's television experience does not qualify him for a job at a real law firm.

Cast

Main
 Rob Lowe as Dean Sanderson Jr., an actor who played the role of attorney Mitch Grinder on the long-running TV show, The Grinder.
 Fred Savage as Stewart Sanderson, Dean's brother who is an actual attorney.
 Mary Elizabeth Ellis as Debbie Sanderson, Stewart's wife.
 William Devane as Dean Sanderson Sr., Dean and Stewart’s father and head of the law firm.
 Natalie Morales as Claire Lacoste, a new associate in the Sanderson & Yao law firm who is resistant to Dean's romantic advances.
 Hana Hayes as Lizzie Sanderson, Stewart and Debbie's 15-year-old daughter.
 Connor Kalopsis as Ethan Sanderson, Stewart and Debbie's 13-year-old son.

Recurring
 Steve Little as Todd, an attorney of questionable skill who works at Sanderson & Yao, and is also a huge fan of Dean's.
John Owen Lowe as Joel Zadack, Lizzie's boyfriend, they eventually break up after becoming more comfortable hanging out with her family.
 Jason Alexander as Cliff Bemis, the creator and head writer for The Grinder TV show, whose constant disagreements with Dean led to Dean leaving the show.
 Kumail Nanjiani as Leonard, a prosecuting attorney who gets humiliated by Dean in the courtroom. 
 Timothy Olyphant as a fictionalized version of himself who becomes Dean's nemesis; he assumes the starring role of Rake Grinder on The Grinder: New Orleans after convincing Dean to quit the show, and then begins dating Claire.
 Maya Rudolph as Jillian, Stewart and Dean's therapist, who later becomes Dean's girlfriend, much to Stewart's chagrin.
 Kenny Lucas as Cory Manler, a former Sanderson & Yao client who sues the firm for malpractice.
 Matt Hobby as Pat Landy
 Keith Lucas as Rory Manler, twin brother of Cory Manler.

Episodes

Reception

Critical reception
On Rotten Tomatoes the season has a rating of 93%, based on 57 reviews, with an average rating of 7.4/10. The site's critical consensus reads, "The Grinders humor is buoyed by Rob Lowe and Fred Savage's chemistry as a hilarious new odd couple." On Metacritic, the season has a score of 71 out of 100, based on 23 critics, indicating "generally favorable reviews".

As the first season progressed, the show began to become more popular with critics. Many critics compared The Grinder to shows such as Arrested Development, Community, and Better Off Ted, all of which were shows that had small audiences in their time slots on broadcast television, but received largely positive critical reception because of their characters and writing.

Accolades

References

External links
 
 
 

2010s American single-camera sitcoms
2015 American television series debuts
2016 American television series endings
2010s American legal television series
2010s American workplace comedy television series
English-language television shows
Fox Broadcasting Company original programming
Television series about television
Television series by 20th Century Fox Television
Television shows set in Idaho